Paranerita basirubra is a moth of the subfamily Arctiinae. It was described by Reich in 1935. It is found in Brazil.

References

Paranerita
Moths described in 1935